The 'International University of Goražde is a private university located in the city of Goražde, Bosnia and Herzegovina. It is open to students from Bosnia and Herzegovina, and all over the Levant and the Middle East. The language of instruction and communication is English. It offers education according to Bologna system ( I. cycle, II. cycle, and III. cycle diplomas).

The university has local and international students in three faculties and 12 departments performing academic activities in the disciplines of science, engineering, and social sciences. The first generation of students was enrolled in the 2015–2016 academic year.

University administration 

The rector, Prof. Dr. Šefket Krcić, was born in Plavu. He is a philosophist.

Organization 

The International University of Goražde comprises:
 Faculty of Social Sciences (Department of Law, Business Economy, Banking, and Management)
 Faculty of Technical Sciences (Department of Architecture, Civil Engineering, Survey, and Electrical Engineering)
 Faculty of Medical Sciences (Department of General Medicine, Stomatology, Pharmacy, Medical Nursery, and Physiotherapy)
 Faculty of Educational Sciences (Department of Psychology, Turkish Language and Literature)

Student activities 

Students have been involved in various activities.

Campus 

The university has a plan to build a modern urban campus in the city of Goražde in the near future.

References

External links 
 

Education in Bosnia and Herzegovina
Private universities and colleges